Vratno is a settlement in the Žumberak/Gorjanci Hills in the Municipality of Šentjernej in southeastern Slovenia. It is part of the traditional region of Lower Carniola and is now included in the Southeast Slovenia Statistical Region.

References

External links
Vratno on Geopedia

Populated places in the Municipality of Šentjernej